Tom Trogh (b. 17 June 1984) is a Belgian quiz player who has won several international titles with the national team of quizzing powerhouse Belgium. He has established himself as the third best player of his country behind Ronny Swiggers and Nico Pattyn. Like all Belgian stars he is an amateur, he works as an actuary in a life insurance company.

He has been a member of the National Team since 2006 and has won two European team titles (EQC) in 2006 and 2008, four Silver medals in 2007, 2009, 2010 and 2013, and twice Bronze in 2011 and 2012. With his club "Clockwork" from Leuven (other members are Erik Derycke (the fourth national player), Marnix Baes, Bart Permentier) he reached European Silver in 2007 and Bronze in 2010 and 2013.

He also won the European double competition with Derycke in 2007, and was second in 2011.

On an individual level he has made a big jump from 2008 to 2009 from rank #39 to 10+-. He placed 11th at the World Quizzing Championship (WQC) both in 2009 and 2010 and  10th (2009) and 8th (2010) respectively at the EQC (all results at iqa.be), making him the only contender under the age of 30.

His strongest subject is Sports.

External links
Bio at Quizmeisterschaften
His club Clockwork

References 

Belgian sportspeople
1984 births
Living people
IQA team event gold medalists